Karl Gustaf Westman (18 August 1876 – 24 January 1944) was a Swedish historian and political leader.

Biography
Westman attended Uppsala University, where he earned a bachelor's degree in 1897, Licentiate of Philosophy in 1904 and a Ph.D. 1905. He was professor of the History of Law in the faculty of law at Uppsala University (1910–1941).

In political office, he represented the Agrarian Bondeförbundet, which was established in 1913. He was minister of education and ecclesiastical affairs (1914–1917). He served as foreign minister (1936), and justice minister (1936–1943). Although not the chairman of his party, Westman was without doubt his party's most influential cabinet member.

As a justice minister, and as one of the cabinet members with a say in matters of foreign policy during World War II, Westman has been criticized for what some observers have perceived as exaggerated adaptation to Nazi Germany's expected victory in the war, and for a limited respect for the freedom of the press to criticize foreign powers.

Personal life
Karl Gustaf Westman was the son of the postmaster Carl Johan Westman and Tonny (Andersson) Westman. He was the brother of the diplomat Karl Ivan Westman. He was married in 1935 to Margit Printz. Children: Ingun  Margareta (born 1936), Sighild  Margareta (born 1937) and Karl Joar (born 1939). Westman was buried on 2 February 1944 at  Gamla kyrkogården  in Uppsala.

In popular culture
In the Swedish television movie Four days that shook Sweden - The Midsummer Crisis 1941, from 1988, he is played by Swedish actor Allan Svensson.

References

External links

20th-century Swedish historians
Swedish Ministers for Foreign Affairs
Uppsala University alumni
1876 births
1944 deaths
Swedish Ministers of Education and Ecclesiastical Affairs
Swedish Ministers for Justice
Politicians from Gothenburg
Members of the Första kammaren
Burials at Uppsala old cemetery
Westman family
Academic staff of Uppsala University
Members of the Royal Society of Sciences in Uppsala